Women in the Mexican drug war have been civilians and participants. Since the beginning of the Mexican Drug War in 2006, female civilians, both Mexican citizens and foreigners, have been victims of extortion, rape, torture, and murder, as well as forced disappearance, by belligerents on all sides. Citizens and foreign women and girls have been sex trafficked in Mexico by the cartels and gangs. The criminal organizations, in turn, use the profits to buy weapons and expand. They have harmed and carried out sexual assault of migrants from Latin America to the United States. The violence against women in the drug war has spread beyond Mexico to bordering and nearby countries in Central America and North America. The number of women killed in the conflict is unknown because of the lack of data. Women officials, judges, lawyers, paralegals, reporters, business owners, social media influencers, teachers, and non-governmental organizations directors have also been involved in the conflict in different capacities. There have been female combatants in the military, police, cartels, and gangs. Women have lost loved ones in the conflict.

Female civilians and victims

Civilian women, as well as young women and girls, in Mexico have been physically and psychologically harmed in the conflict. A number have had little protection because of corruption, impunity, and apathy. 
Businesswomen and female farmers and laborers are threatened and coerced to pay taxes to drug gangs. Other women are forced to cultivate or pack drugs. Sex trafficking in Mexico is a significant problem. Women have been forced to be mules. They have been killed in the crossfire of gun fights and assassinations. Some women have been killed for refusing the romantic advances of men, witnessing crimes, being informants, activists against crime, and other reasons. Female police and military officers, as well as federal agents and their family members have been murdered because of their occupation and or anti-cartel efforts. Female lawyers have been killed too. Women have also been murdered for being the grandmothers, mothers, wives, daughters, nieces, sisters, aunts, cousins, coworkers, or friends of persons targeted for assassination. Women have been bound and tortured. Women's corpses have been decapitated and mutilated in other ways. Female bodies have been disemboweled and hung from bridges. The bodies and body parts of women have been displayed in other ways, including being dumped on and along highways. The perpetrators sometimes leave written signs with threats and why they murdered the victims.

Women have been raped, tortured, and murdered by Mexican military forces and police.

Sexual assault of migrants from Latin America to the United States, many who are escaping the drug war violence, is pervasive.

Female officials

Female officials and their family members have been murdered in the drug war.

Female journalists and media workers

Female reporters and their family members have been murdered in the drug war for writing anti-cartel articles for newspapers or posting messages on the internet.

The girlfriends, wives, and daughters of male journalists and media workers have been murdered.

Female participants

Women have participated in the Mexican War on Drugs. They have served for all belligerents. Women have been members of cartels and gangs. There have been female assassins and drug money launderers. Others have obstructed justice on behalf of the cartels. They have transacted with drug trafficking entities and individuals in other ways. Women have fought against the cartels and gangs as police, military, lawyers, paralegals, prosecutors, activists, and more.

Sex trafficking and rape

Cartels and gangs fighting in the Mexican War on Drugs have sex trafficked women and girls in order to obtain additional profits. The cartels and gangs also abduct women to use as their personal sex slaves and force them into unfree labour. The sexual assault of migrants from Latin America to the United States by members of these criminal organizations is a problem.

Unreliable casualty numbers

The number of women killed in the conflict cannot be known because the absence of data from corruption, cover-ups, bad record keeping, and failures in interagency communication. A number of cases involving murders and disappearances have gone uninvestigated or unsolved because the authorities feared being harmed by cartel or gang members. Some corrupt or coerced authorities have tampered with evidence and documents to conceal information. A great number of bodies of victims have not been found. The criminals have been known to use acids and corrosive liquids, fire, and other methods to dispose of remains and make identification difficult to impossible. Criminals have stolen bodies from crime scenes and morgues. Data has been manipulated. Government workers have intentionally underreported violent crimes.

References

Mexican drug war
Rape in Mexico
Violence against women in Mexico
Women in Mexico
Women's rights in Mexico
Gender and crime
21st-century Mexican women
History of women in Mexico